Cladosporium spinulosum is a fungus found in hypersaline environments. It has globoid, ornamented conidia with long digitate projections.

References

Cladosporium
Fungi described in 2007